The Sapo River is a river in the U.S. commonwealth of Puerto Rico.

References

Rivers of Puerto Rico